The Roman Catholic Metropolitan Archdiocese of Nanjing (Jiangsu) is an ecclesiastical territory or diocese of the Roman Catholic Church in China.

History

It was erected as the Apostolic Vicariate of Nanjing in 1659 by Pope Alexander VII, and promoted to a diocese by Pope Alexander VIII on April 10, 1690. On 15 October 1696, its territory was reduced by Pope Innocent XII to two provinces: Jiangnan (the present day provinces of Anhui, Jiangsu, and Shanghai) and Ho-nan (Henan province). The diocese was demoted to the Apostolic Vicariate of Kiangnan on January 21, 1856 by Pope Pius IX, and its name was later changed to the Apostolic Vicariate of Kiangsu on August 8, 1921 and to the Vicariate Apostolic of Nanjing on May 1, 1922. Pope Pius XII elevated it on April 11, 1946 to the rank of a metropolitan archdiocese, with the suffragan sees of Haimen, Shanghai, Suzhou, and Xuzhou.

The archdiocese's motherchurch and thus seat of its archbishop is the Cathedral of the Immaculate Conception also known as the Shigu Road church. There were a number of years without a bishop after the death of Paul Cardinal Yü Pin on August 16, 1978, because of the irregular relations between the Communist government and the Holy See. On January 6, 2000, Francis Savio Lu Xinping was ordained the new bishop of Nanjing along with four others in an illicit ceremony in Beijing's South Cathedral. Since then he has been reconciled to the Holy See.

List of Ordinaries of Nanjing

Vicar Apostolic of Nanjing
Ignace Cotolendi (1660–1662)
sede vacante
Gregory Luo Wen-zao, O.P. (1674–1690)

Bishop of Nanjing
Gregory Luo Wen-zao, O.P. (1690–1691), also known as Gregory Lopez in the Philippines
Father Giovanni Francesco Nicolai, O.F.M. (Administrator, 1691–1694), nominated by Wen-zao as his successor on May 29, 1688 under authority granted by the Holy See, served as administrator upon Wen-zao's death, not consecrated until 1700 as Vicar Apostolic of Houkouang
Father Francisco Spinola, S.J. (Coadjutator, 1690–1694), appointed 1690 but did not take effect as he died in 1694 before reaching China, never consecrated
Alessandro Ciceri, S.J. (1694–1703)
Antonio de Silva, S.J. (1707–1726)
António Paes Godinho, S.J. (1718–1721)
Emmanuel de Jesus-Maria-Joseph, O.F.M. (1721–1739)
Francesco de Santa Rosa de Viterbo, O.F.M. Ref. (1742–1750)
Gottfried Xaver von Laimbeckhoven, S.J. (1752–1787)
Alexandre de Gouvea (Gouveia), T.O.R. (1787–1804)
Cayetano Pires Pireira, C.M. (1804–1838)

Vicar Apostolic of Kiangnan
André-Pierre Borgniet, S.J. (1859–1862)
Adrien-Hippolyte Languillat, SJ (1864–1878)
Valentin Garnier, S.J. (1879–1898)
Jean-Baptiste Simon, S.J. (1899)
Próspero París, S.J. (1900–1931)

Vicar Apostolic of Kiangsu
Próspero París, S.J. (1900–1931)

Vicar Apostolic of Nanjing
Próspero París, S.J. (1900–1931)
Auguste Haouisée, S.J. (1931–1933)
Paul Yü Pin (1936–1978)

Archdiocese of Nanjing
Paul Yü Pin (1936–1978)
Francis Xavier Lu Xinping (2000–present)

See also

Cathedral of the Immaculate Conception in Nanjing
Christianity in China
Roman Catholicism in China
Chinese Patriotic Catholic Association
List of Catholic cathedrals in China
List of Roman Catholic dioceses in China
List of Roman Catholic dioceses (structured_view)-Episcopal Conference of China

Further reading
 David Strong, A Call to Mission -- A History of the Jesuits in China 1842-1954. Volume 1: The French Romance, ATF Press, 2018.

References

External links

Catholic-Hierarchy
GCatholic.org

Nanjing
History of Jiangsu
1659 establishments in China
Religious organizations established in the 1650s
Nanjing
Roman Catholic dioceses and prelatures established in the 17th century
Religion in Jiangsu